Crystal Catherine Eastman (June 25, 1881 – July 28, 1928)
 was an American lawyer, antimilitarist, feminist, socialist, and journalist. She is best remembered as a leader in the fight for women's suffrage, as a co-founder and co-editor with her brother Max Eastman of the radical arts and politics magazine The Liberator, co-founder of the Women's International League for Peace and Freedom, and co-founder in 1920 of the American Civil Liberties Union. In 2000 she was inducted into the National Women's Hall of Fame in Seneca Falls, New York.

Early life and education

Crystal Eastman was born in Marlborough, Massachusetts, on June 25, 1881, the third of four children. Her oldest brother, Morgan, was born in 1878 and died in 1884. The second brother, Anstice Ford Eastman, who became a general surgeon, was born in 1878 and died in 1937. Max was the youngest, born in 1882.

In 1883, their parents, Samuel Elijah Eastman and Annis Bertha Ford, moved the family to Canandaigua, New York. In 1889, their mother became one of the first women ordained as a Protestant minister in America when she became a minister of the Congregational church. Her father was also a Congregational minister, and the two served as pastors at the church of Thomas K. Beecher near Elmira. Her parents were friendly with writer Mark Twain. From this association young Crystal also became acquainted with him.

This part of New York was in the so-called "Burnt Over District." During the Second Great Awakening earlier in the 19th century, its frontier had been a center of evangelizing and much religious excitement, which resulted in the founding of such beliefs as Millerism and Mormonism. During the antebellum period, some were inspired by religious ideals to support such progressive social causes as abolitionism and the Underground Railroad.

Crystal and her brother Max Eastman were influenced by this humanitarian tradition. He became a socialist activist in his early life, and Crystal had several common causes with him. They were close throughout her life, even after he had become more conservative.

The siblings lived together for several years on 11th Street in New York City's Greenwich Village among other radical activists. The group, including Ida Rauh, Inez Milholland, Floyd Dell, and Doris Stevens, also spent summers and weekends in Croton-on-Hudson, where Max bought a house in 1916.

Eastman graduated from Vassar College in 1903 and received a Master of Arts degree in sociology (then a relatively new field) from Columbia University in 1904. She then attended New York University Law School, graduating in 1907 as the second in her class.

Social efforts

Social work pioneer and journal editor Paul Kellogg offered Eastman her first job, investigating labor conditions for The Pittsburgh Survey sponsored by the Russell Sage Foundation. Her report, Work Accidents and the Law (1910), became a classic and resulted in the first workers' compensation law, which she drafted while serving on a New York state commission.

She continued to campaign for occupational safety and health while working as an investigating attorney for the U.S. Commission on Industrial Relations during Woodrow Wilson's presidency. She was at one time called the "most dangerous woman in America," due to her free-love idealism and outspoken nature.

She advocated for "motherhood endowments" whereby mothers of young children would receive monetary benefits. She argued it would reduce forced dependence of mothers on men, as well as economically empower women.

Emancipation

During a brief marriage to Wallace J. Benedict, which ended in divorce, Eastman moved to Milwaukee with him. There she managed the unsuccessful 1912 Wisconsin suffrage campaign.

When she returned east in 1913, she joined Alice Paul, Lucy Burns, and others in founding the militant Congressional Union, which became the National Woman's Party. After the passage of the 19th Amendment gave women the right to vote in 1920, Eastman and Paul wrote the Equal Rights Amendment, first introduced in 1923. One of the few socialists to endorse the ERA, Eastman warned that protective legislation for women would mean only discrimination against women. Eastman claimed that one could assess the importance of the ERA by the intensity of the opposition to it, but she felt that it was still a struggle worth fighting. She also delivered the speech, "Now We Can Begin", following the ratification of the Nineteenth Amendment, outlining the work that needed to be done in the political and economic spheres to achieve gender equality.

Peace efforts

During World War I, Eastman was one of the founders of the Woman's Peace Party, soon joined by Jane Addams, Lillian D. Wald, and others. She served as president of the New York City branch. Renamed the Women's International League for Peace and Freedom in 1921, it remains the oldest extant women's peace organization. Eastman also became executive director of the American Union Against Militarism, which lobbied against America's entrance into the European war and more successfully against war with Mexico in 1916, sought to remove profiteering from arms manufacturing, and campaigned against conscription, imperial adventures and military intervention.

When the United States entered World War I, Eastman organized with Roger Baldwin and Norman Thomas the National Civil Liberties Bureau to protect conscientious objectors, or in her words: "To maintain something over here that will be worth coming back to when the weary war is over." The NCLB grew into the American Civil Liberties Union, with Baldwin at the head and Eastman functioning as attorney-in-charge. Eastman is credited as a founding member of the ACLU, but her role as founder of the NCLB may have been largely ignored by posterity due to her personal differences with Baldwin.

Marriage and family
In 1916 Eastman married the British editor and antiwar activist Walter Fuller, who had come to the United States to direct his sisters’ singing of folksongs.  They had two children, Jeffrey and Annis.  They worked together as activists until the end of the war; then he worked as the managing editor of The Freeman until 1922 when he returned to England. He died in 1927, nine months before Crystal, ending his career editing Radio Times for the BBC.

After Max Eastman's periodical The Masses was forced to close by government censorship in 1917, he and Crystal co-founded a radical journal of politics, art, and literature, The Liberator, early in 1918. She and Max co-edited it until they put it in the hands of faithful friends in 1922.

Post-War
After the war, Eastman organized the First Feminist Congress in 1919.

At times she traveled by ship to London to be with her husband. In New York, her activities led to her being blacklisted during the Red Scare of 1919–1920. She struggled to find paying work. Her only paid work during the 1920s was as a columnist for feminist journals, notably Equal Rights and Time and Tide.

Eastman claimed that "life was a big battle for the complete feminist," but she was convinced that the complete feminist would someday achieve total victory.

Death
Crystal Eastman died on July 8, 1928, of nephritis. Her friends were entrusted with her two children, then orphans, to rear them until adulthood.

Legacy
Eastman has been called one of the United States' most neglected leaders, because, although she wrote pioneering legislation and created long-lasting political organizations, she disappeared from history for fifty years. Freda Kirchwey, then editor of The Nation, wrote at the time of her death: "When she spoke to people—whether it was to a small committee or a swarming crowd—hearts beat faster. She was for thousands a symbol of what the free woman might be."

Her speech "Now We Can Begin", given in 1920, is listed as #83 in American Rhetoric's Top 100 Speeches of the 20th Century (listed by rank).

In 2000 Eastman was inducted into the (American) National Women's Hall of Fame in Seneca Falls, New York.

In 2018 The Socialist, the official publication of the Socialist Party USA, published the article "Remembering Socialist Feminist Crystal Eastman" by Lisa Petriello, which was written "on the 90th-year anniversary of her [Eastman's] death to bring her life and legacy once again to the public eye."

Work

Papers
Eastman's papers are housed at Harvard University.

Publications
The Library of Congress has the following publications by Eastman in its collection, many of them published posthumously:
  'Employers' Liability,' a Criticism Based on Facts (1909)
 Work-accidents and the Law (1910)
 Mexican-American Peace Committee (Mexican-American league) (1916)
 Work accidents and the Law (1969)
 Toward the Great Change: Crystal and Max Eastman on Feminism, Antimilitarism, and Revolution, edited by Blanche Wiesen Cook (1976)
 Crystal Eastman on Women and Revolution, edited by Blanche Wiesen Cook (1978)

See also

People

 Alice Paul
 Lucy Burns
 Jane Addams
 Lillian D. Wald
 Roger Baldwin
 Norman Thomas
 Walter Fuller
 Jeffrey Fuller
 Max Eastman

Political groups

 National Woman's Party
 Women's International League for Peace and Freedom
 Woman's Peace Party
 Women's International League for Peace and Freedom
 American Union Against Militarism
 National Civil Liberties Bureau/American Civil Liberties Union

Other

 List of peace activists
 The Pittsburgh Survey
 Workers' compensation
 U.S. Commission on Industrial Relations
 19th Amendment
 Equal Rights Amendment
 The Liberator

Footnotes

Further reading
 Amy Aronson, Crystal Eastman: A Revolutionary Life, Oxford University Press, 2019.
 Blanche Wiesen Cook, ed., Crystal Eastman on Women and Revolution. (1978).
 Cook, Blanche Wiesen, "Radical Women of Greenwich Village," in Greenwich Village, eds. Rick Beard and Leslie Cohen Berlowitz. Newark: Rutgers University Press, 1993.
 Sochen, June, The New Woman in Greenwich Village, 1910–1920. New York: Quadrangle Books, 1972.
 Read J., Phyllis; Witlieb L., Bernard: The Book of Women's Firsts. New York Random House 1992.
 Kerber K., Linda; Sherron DeHart, Jane: Women's America: Refocusing The Past, Oxford University Press, 1995, 4th Edition.

External links

 
 Crystal Eastman Papers Finding Aid, Schlesinger Library, Radcliffe Institute, Harvard University.
 crystaleastman.org

1881 births
1928 deaths
20th-century American journalists
20th-century American lawyers
American anti-war activists
American anti–World War I activists
American Civil Liberties Union people
American magazine editors
American pacifists
American political activists
American socialists
American suffragists
American women journalists
Columbia Graduate School of Arts and Sciences alumni
Journalists from Massachusetts
Journalists from New York (state)
Massachusetts socialists
National Woman's Party activists
New York (state) socialists
New York University School of Law alumni
Non-interventionism
American opinion journalists
Pacifist feminists
People from Canandaigua, New York
People from Croton-on-Hudson, New York
People from Greenwich Village
People from Marlborough, Massachusetts
American socialist feminists
Vassar College alumni
Women's International League for Peace and Freedom people
Women magazine editors
20th-century American women lawyers
Female Christian socialists
Women Christian religious leaders
Proponents of Christian feminism
Equal Rights Amendment activists
Deaths from nephritis